Colonel Caleb Hopkins (1770 – January 14, 1818) was an officer during the War of 1812 and the first town supervisor of Pittsford, New York, United States.

History
In 1791, Caleb Hopkins moved from his hometown, Pittsford, Vermont, in Rutland County, to what is now Monroe County, New York, and built the first log dwelling in the present town of Penfield. The Hopkins Homestead is identified by a historic marker at 3151 Clover Street.

Hopkins became a prominent businessman in Pittsford as a farmer and in mercantile pursuits. In 1808, he was appointed supervisor of the town of Boyle (which later became Pittsford). In 1809, President James Madison appointed him United States collector of customs for the port of Genesee (now Rochester, New York), a post he held until May 1817.

In 1814, the town of Smallwood was divided into Brighton and Pittsford, and Colonel Hopkins named the latter in honor of his birthplace in Vermont. In 1816 and 1817, he was a member of the general assembly of New York and served on the committee in military affairs.

Military service in the War of 1812
In 1804, Hopkins was commissioned as a lieutenant of the militia, and was promoted to major in 1807. He was active in the War of 1812, attaining lieutenant colonel in 1812 and colonel in 1813. He was involved in several battles and skirmishes and once was wounded in the shoulder.

Skirmish in New York
On January 8, 1814. Lt. Colonel Caleb Hopkins and General John Swift who are both militia commanders led a hit-and-run surprise attack on a British contingent that was out collecting wood. Caleb Hopkins and John Swift led 70 American militiamen in this engagement. The American militia surprised the British party. The British suffered 4 killed and 8 captured. The American militia only suffered 1 killed. The Americans withdrew back to Canandaigua with their prisoners after their successful surprise attack.

Later life
In March 1816, Colonel Hopkins was commissioned as brigadier general for gallant service during the war, including defending the Port of Charlotte, Rochester, New York against the British.

References

Biographies of Monroe County People - Caleb Hopkins
Historic Markers in Monroe County - Hopkins Homestead
How Northfield Became Pittsford
Pioneer Burying Ground

Military personnel from Rochester, New York
American militiamen in the War of 1812
1770 births
1818 deaths
People from Pittsford, Vermont
American militia generals